The 2013 Waterford Senior Hurling Championship was the 113th staging of the Waterford Senior Hurling Championship since its establishment in 1887. The championship ended on 13 October 2013.

De La Salle were the defending champions, however, they were defeated at the quarter-finals stage. Passage won the title, following a 3-16 to 3-13 defeat of Ballygunner in the final.

Teams

Overview

All but one of the twelve teams from the 2012 championship are participated in the top tier of Waterford hurling in 2013.

An Rinn, who defeated Portlaw by 1-14 to 0-4 in the final of the intermediate championship in 2012, availed of their right to automatic promotion to the senior championship.

Similarly, Ballyduff Upper defeated Dunhill by 1-20 to 0-18 in the 2012 relegation play-off, and so Dunhill were relegated to the intermediate grade for 2013.

Results

Group 1

Group 2

Quarter-finals

Semi-finals

Final

External links

 2013 Senior Hurling Championship Group 1 results
 2013 Senior Hurling Championship Group 2 results

References

Waterford Senior Hurling Championship
Waterford Senior Hurling Championship